Susan J. Serino (born September 8, 1961) is an American politician and was a member of the New York State Senate, representing the 41st district from 2015 to 2022. The district encompasses portions of the Hudson Valley, including Poughkeepsie. Serino is a Republican.

Prior to her time in the Senate, Serino served as a member of the Dutchess County Legislature.

Background 
Serino was born and raised in Dutchess County, New York. The daughter of immigrants, Serino worked waiting tables and later started her own childcare business.

In 1996, Serino joined the real estate industry, opening a real estate office in Poughkeepsie. In 2003, she moved her office to Hyde Park, New York. As of 2019, the office has over twenty sales associates.

In 2010, Serino first won elected office as a member of the Hyde Park town board. A year later, in 2011, Serino was elected to the Dutchess County Legislature. She was re-elected in 2013, running unopposed.

New York Senate 
In 2014, Serino was recruited by Senate Republicans to run against first-term incumbent Terry Gipson. While Gipson had won election in 2012, the district had been reliably Republican in prior years. Serino defeated Gipson, 51% to 46%. Gipson would seek a rematch against Serino in 2016; this time, Serino prevailed by a margin of 52%-42%.

In 2018, Serino narrowly won re-election to a third term, defeating Democrat Karen Smythe by only 688 votes.

References

External links
New York State Senator Sue Serino official site

Living people
Women state legislators in New York (state)
New York (state) Republicans
People from Hyde Park, New York
People from Dutchess County, New York
1961 births
21st-century American women politicians
21st-century American politicians